Sieglinde Cadusch (born 28 August 1967) is a retired Swiss high jumper.

She competed at the 1992 Olympic Games, 1994 European Championships, the 1995 World Championships and the 1996 Olympic Games as well as the World Indoor Championships in 1993, 1995 and 1997 without reaching the final.

Her personal best jump is 1.95 metres, achieved in September 1995 in Marietta.

References

1967 births
Living people
Swiss female high jumpers
Athletes (track and field) at the 1992 Summer Olympics
Athletes (track and field) at the 1996 Summer Olympics
Olympic athletes of Switzerland